Gondek-e Isa (also Romanized as Gondek-e ‘Īsá; also known as Kondak,  Kondek-e ‘Īsá, and Kundak) is a village in Gazin Rural District, Raghiveh District, Haftgel County, Khuzestan Province, Iran. At the 2006 census, its population was 161, in 27 families.

References 

Populated places in Haftkel County